Open is an embedded finance company that builds and manages infrastructure for the global insurance industry. It is based in Sydney, Australia and Auckland, New Zealand.

The company primarily offers embedded insurance products that are managed with application programming interfaces (APIs). These products are embedded and offered to the customers of telecommunication, energy, travel, banking and retail companies.

History 

Open (Open Insurance Pty Ltd) was founded in Australia during June 2016 by British expats Jonathan Buck and Jason Wilby. The pair initially launched a consumer brand Huddle with the aim of challenging traditional financial services in Australia and offering a transparent and technology driven model for consumers.

Early products were based on the concept of the peer economy, with the aim of reducing the cost of financial products such as loans and insurance in Australia.

In April 2017 the company became a certified B Corporation, to verify that the company is meeting obligations that benefit all stakeholders not just shareholders.

Two years after its founding the company secured a $19.25 million Series B investment led by Airtree Ventures.

In 2020 the company launched the Open Insurance stack, a collection of applications and infrastructure used by global insurance companies to embed car, home and travel insurance.

Funding 
Open is a privately owned company that initially raised $6 million from investors, including Richard Enthoven, and Hollard Insurance Group. The company's insurance products are also underwritten by Hollard Insurance Group.

In November 2018 the company announced a new round of funding. Through this Series A the company secured a further $19.25 million led by Airtree Ventures.

In August 2020 the company announced a follow-on round for their current investors. This raised $3.1m and was again led by Airtree Ventures.

In August 2021, Open announced a Series B, led by Movac valued at $31 million.

Products and Services 
Open provides pricing, claims and administration infrastructure required for insurers, brokers, and retail brands to offer service insurance online.

Open's customers include Telstra, Bupa, Polestar, and Slingshot.

References 

Financial services companies established in 2016
Financial services companies of Australia